Friedrich Anton Ulrich, Prince of Waldeck and Pyrmont (27 November 16761 January 1728) was the first reigning Prince of Waldeck and Pyrmont from 1712 to 1728.

He was the son of Christian Louis, Count of Waldeck and Countess Anna Elisabeth of Rappoltstein.

From 1706 to 1712 he was Count of Waldeck and Pyrmont. On 6 January 1712 he was elevated to Prince by the Emperor Charles VI.

Marriage and children
He married Countess Palatine Louise of Zweibrücken-Birkenfeld, daughter of Christian II, Count Palatine of Zweibrücken-Birkenfeld and Countess Catharine Agathe of Rappoltstein, in Hanau on 22 Oct 1700. They had five sons and six daughters:

Prince Christian of Waldeck and Pyrmont (13 October 1701 – 17 May 1728)
Princess Friederike of Waldeck and Pyrmont (10 November 1702 – 4 December 1713)
Princess Henriette of Waldeck and Pyrmont (17 October 1703 – 29 August 1785)
Karl August, Prince of Waldeck and Pyrmont (24 September 1704 – 29 August 1763), married Countess Palatine Christiane Henriette of Zweibrücken-Birkenfeld, had issue.
Princess Ernestine of Waldeck and Pyrmont (6 November 1705 – 26 May 1782), married Frederick Bernard, Count Palatine of Gelnhausen, had issue.
Prince Louis of Waldeck and Pyrmont (5 May 1707 – 24 July 1739)
Prince Johann of Waldeck and Pyrmont (9 June 1708 – 30 November 1713)
Princess Sofie of Waldeck and Pyrmont (4 January 1711 – 10 August 1775), married Frederick August Vogelsang, no issue.
Princess Franziska of Waldeck and Pyrmont (19 May 1712 – 6 January 1782)
Princess Louise of Waldeck and Pyrmont (12 June 1714 – 17 March 1794)
Prince Josef of Waldeck and Pyrmont (14 August 1715 – 19 February 1719)

Ancestry

Notes and sources
 
 waldecker-muenzen.de

1676 births
1728 deaths
People from Waldeck (state)
Princes of Waldeck and Pyrmont
House of Waldeck and Pyrmont
Counts of Waldeck